The 1871–72 College of New Jersey Tigers men's soccer team represented Princeton University during the 1871–72 college soccer season. The team finished with a 1–0–0 record and was retroactively named the national soccer champion by the American Soccer History Archives and the Intercollegiate Football Record Association. 

The Tigers played the nearby Princeton Theological Seminary in a match on October 21, 1871, where they won 6–4.

Schedule 

|-
!colspan=6 style=""| Matches
|-

References 

College of New Jersey
Princeton Tigers men's soccer seasons
College of New Jersey
College of New Jersey
College soccer national championship-winning seasons (1866–1904)